George David Odom (born October 9, 1942) is a retired American men's college basketball coach. He served as the head coach of the East Carolina Pirates, Wake Forest Demon Deacons and South Carolina Gamecocks.

Playing career
Odom began his career in sports at Goldsboro High School, in North Carolina, as the captain of his basketball and baseball teams. After graduating in 1961, he attended Guilford College where he played quarterback on the football team for three years, as well as playing basketball for all four years. As a senior in 1965, Odom was named the college's most outstanding athlete. He was also inducted into the Guilford College Athletics Hall of Fame in 1983.  Pete Maravich remarked late in his life that he had patterned many of his signature moves off of Odom's game.

Early career
After graduation in 1965, Odom accepted a job as the coach of Goldsboro High School while enrolled at East Carolina University in pursuit of a master's degree in physical education. Odom coached Goldsboro High School for four seasons between 1965 and 1969; he was also a drivers ed instructor during this time. After graduating from East Carolina in 1969, Odom took a job at Durham High School. He coached at Durham for seven years (1969–1976) where he was voted his league's coach of the year five times.

Early collegiate career
Odom began his collegiate coaching career as an assistant at Wake Forest University in 1976 under head coach Carl Tacy. After three years at Wake Forest (1976–1979), Odom became the head coach at East Carolina University, where his squad compiled a 16–11 record, the university's best since 1965. Odom stayed with the program until 1982, when he was offered a chance to return to the Atlantic Coast Conference (ACC) as an assistant at the University of Virginia.

As an assistant at Virginia (1982–1989) under head coach Terry Holland, Odom participated in some of the university's most successful seasons, including five National Collegiate Athletic Association berths and a trip to the Final Four in 1984. During this time, Odom coached future No. 1 NBA draft pick Ralph Sampson, who graduated in 1983. Odom served as acting head coach when Holland missed several games due to illness in the 1988–1989 season. Odom left Virginia in 1989 to return to Winston-Salem as the head coach of Wake Forest University.

Wake Forest
Upon his arrival in Winston-Salem, Odom inherited a team that had suffered four straight losing seasons under head coach Bob Staak.  In his 12 seasons (1989–2001) as head coach, Odom compiled a record of 240–132, making him the second-highest winning coach in Wake Forest history, as well as the second highest winning percentage in school history. During this time, Wake Forest earned 7 straight NCAA Tournament appearances and one National Invitation Tournament (NIT) championship.

Odom was named ACC coach of the year in 1991, 1994 and 1995. He led his team to consecutive ACC Championships in 1995 and 1996. Much of the success during these two years is attributed to star center Tim Duncan, whom he recruited as a player in the U.S. Virgin Islands in 1994. In 1995, led by Duncan, the team put up a 26–6 overall record, including winning the ACC tournament by defeating North Carolina by the score of 82–80, with the victory coming from a last second shot by point guard Randolph Childress. In 1996, the team successfully defended its title with a record of 26–6 by defeating Georgia Tech by a score of 75–74.

South Carolina
Odom left Wake Forest to accept the job as head coach of the University of South Carolina in 2001, replacing former coach Eddie Fogler. During his tenure at South Carolina, his team earned one NCAA tournament bid, and made three appearances in the NIT, winning the championship in 2005 and 2006. He was named SEC Coach of the Year in 2004. On January 2, 2008, Odom coached his 400th collegiate victory as a head coach. Later that month, on January 18, he announced that he would retire at the end of the 2007–2008 basketball season, his seventh at South Carolina. He coached his final game for USC on March 14, 2008, in the SEC tournament.

Personal
Odom is the father of Utah State head coach Ryan Odom.

Head coaching record

References

External links

 South Carolina profile

1942 births
Living people
American football quarterbacks
American men's basketball coaches
American men's basketball players
Basketball coaches from North Carolina
Basketball players from North Carolina
College basketball announcers in the United States
College men's basketball head coaches in the United States
East Carolina Pirates men's basketball coaches
Guilford Quakers football players
Guilford Quakers men's basketball players
High school basketball coaches in the United States
People from Goldsboro, North Carolina
Place of birth missing (living people)
Players of American football from North Carolina
South Carolina Gamecocks men's basketball coaches
Virginia Cavaliers men's basketball coaches
Wake Forest Demon Deacons men's basketball coaches